Pušnik is a Slovenian language surname. People with the name include:

Katjuša Pušnik (born 1969), Slovenian former alpine skier
Marijan Pušnik (born 1960), Slovenian football manager
Rolando Pušnik (born 1961), Slovenian former handball player 

Slovene-language surnames